Guilty of Treason is a 1950 American drama film directed by Felix E. Feist and starring Charles Bickford, Bonita Granville and Paul Kelly. Also known by the alternative title Treason, it is an anti-communist and anti-Soviet film about the story of József Mindszenty, a Roman Catholic cardinal from Hungary. Mindszenty spoke out against the Nazi occupation of his country during World War II, as well as the later Communist regime. Because of his opposition to the Soviet regime, Mindszenty was arrested and tortured. After his release, he took refuge in the US Embassy in Budapest for many years, maintaining his support for the Hungarians who wanted an end to the Russian occupation.

Synopsis
The film uses the framing device of a speech to members of the Overseas Press Club of America by a journalist who has just returned from Budapest where he witnessed the treason trial of Mindszenty. He also tells the story of Stephanie Varna, a young teacher who decides to stake a moral stand against Communism despite her love for a Russian officer.

Production
The film was inspired by the book As We See Russia written by members of the Overseas Press Club. It was produced by the Anglo-American company Eagle-Lion. Art Direction was by the German emigre Rudi Feld. It was part of a cycle of anti-communist British and American films released in the late 1940s and early 1950s as the Cold War intensified. Mindszenty's story was portrayed again in the 1955 British film The Prisoner.

Main cast
 Charles Bickford as Joszef Cardinal Mindszenty
 Bonita Granville as Stephanie Varna 
 Paul Kelly as Tom Kelly  
 Richard Derr as Colonel Aleksandr Melnikov 
 Roland Winters as Commissar Belov 
 Berry Kroeger as Colonel Timar 
 John Banner as Doctor Szandor Deste  
 Alfred Linder as Janos 
 Thomas Browne Henry as Colonel Gabriel Peter
 Nestor Paiva as Matyas Rakosi 
 Morgan Farley as Doctor  
 Lisa Howard as Soviet Official
 Elisabeth Risdon as Mindszenty's mother

Bibliography
 Shaw, Tony. Hollywood's Cold War. Edinburgh University Press, 2007.

References

External links

 
 

1950 films
1950 drama films
American drama films
American black-and-white films
American anti-communist propaganda films
1950s English-language films
Films critical of communism
Films directed by Felix E. Feist
Eagle-Lion Films films
Films scored by Emil Newman
Films scored by Hugo Friedhofer
Films set in Budapest
Films set in Hungary
Films set in the 1940s
Films about Catholicism
Films about Christianity
Films about religion
American films based on actual events
American courtroom films
1950s American films